Liborio Liguori (born 24 February 1950 in San Costantino Albanese) is an Italian former professional footballer who played as a defender. He played 6 seasons (56 games, 4 goals) in Serie A for Roma.

References

1950 births
Living people
Italian footballers
Association football defenders
A.S. Roma players
Reggina 1914 players
S.S.C. Bari players
U.S. Viterbese 1908 players
Serie A players
Serie B players